Santigron is a Maroon village in Lelydorp, Suriname. The village of Santigron is along the Saramacca River not far from Paramaribo. It is one of Suriname's Maroon villages, where descendants of 18th Century run-away slaves live. Unlike in Brazil or Jamaica, some 20,000 Maroons are still living in Suriname 's rainforest and retain many aspects of their traditional Afro-American culture. The village was founded by Jajasie Adoemakeë in the middle of the 19th century. Adoemakeë started working at a nearby wood plantation, and claimed to have received ownership after the plantation owner died in 1861, however the deed was lost.

The village has a mixed population of the Ndyuka, Saramaka, and Matawai tribes. In the late 19th century, the village was a stronghold of the Gaan Gadu (Great God) religion which rapidly spread to the creole and maroon communities.

References

External links

2013 video of village

Maroon settlements
Populated places in Wanica District